In theatre lighting, a bastard color is a color, typically in a color gel, wherein the predominant color is blended with small amounts of complementary colors; for example, a "bastard orange" gel would produce predominantly orange light with undertones of blue. Bastard colors appear more natural than pure colors and are used to replicate natural light.

References

Color
Stage lighting